Yizi Subdistrict is a subdistrict in Panzhou, Guizhou, China.

History
On July 2, 2013, Hongguo Town was divided into two subdistricts: Hongguo Subdistrict and Yizi Subdistrict.

Administrative division
As of December 2015, the subdistrict is divided into 4 villages and 4 subdistricts: 
 Yizi Community 
 Hongguo Community 
 Donghe Community 
 Baiyan Community 
 Shijiazhuang 
 Dahai 
 Xipu 
 Shangjie

Economy
The main industries in and around the subdistrict is commerce.

Transportation
The subdistrict has several roads and avenues, such as Dujuan Road, Shengjing Avenue and Fengming Road.

Attractions
The East Lake Park is a public park in the subdistrict. The park is used for recreational activities, such as boating, walking, and fishing.

References

Divisions of Panzhou